The 2019 FIBA 3x3 World Cup was held in Amsterdam, the Netherlands, and was contested by 20 teams. Serbia were the three-time defending champions but were defeated in the Semifinals by Latvia. The United States won their first title after having defeated Latvia in the final.

Participating teams
All FIBA continental zones except for FIBA Africa were represented. The top 20 teams, including the hosts, based on the FIBA National Federation ranking qualified for the tournament.

Players

Preliminary round

Pool A

Pool B

Pool C

Pool D

Knockout stage

Final standings

Awards

Individual awards
Most Valuable Player
 Robbie Hummel (USA)
Team of the Tournament 
 Robbie Hummel (USA)
 Michael Hicks (POL)
 Kārlis Lasmanis (LAT)

Individual contests

Dunk contest

Shoot-out contest

References

External links
Official website

Men's
3x3 World Cup
International basketball competitions hosted by the Netherlands
Bask